Jovan Baošić (born 7 July 1995) is a Montenegrin football defender who plays for Budućnost Podgorica in the Montenegrin First League.

Club career 
Born in Bijelo Polje, Baošić moved to Budva at the age of 15, and played for Mogren from 2012 to 2015. He signed for Jagodina in summer 2015.

He played for Montenegro at the 2010 Summer Youth Olympics.

Career statistics

References

External links 
 
 Jovan Baošić stats at utakmica.rs
 
 

1995 births
Living people
People from Bijelo Polje
Association football central defenders
Montenegrin footballers
Montenegro youth international footballers
Footballers at the 2010 Summer Youth Olympics
FK Mogren players
FK Jagodina players
FK Jedinstvo Bijelo Polje players
FK Rudar Pljevlja players
FK Zeta players
Montenegrin First League players
Serbian SuperLiga players
Montenegrin expatriate footballers
Expatriate footballers in Serbia
Montenegrin expatriate sportspeople in Serbia